Hon. Frederick Byron  (3 February 1822 – 4 April 1861) was an English first-class cricketer and barrister.

The son of George Byron, 7th Baron Byron, he was born at Cheltenham in February 1822. He was educated at Westminster School, before going up to Balliol College, Oxford. While studying at Oxford, Byron made a single appearance in first-class cricket for Oxford University against the Marylebone Cricket Club at Oxford in 1841. Batting twice in the match, he was dismissed for 6 runs by James Cobbett in the Oxford first-innings, while in their second-innings he was dismissed for 2 runs by the same bowler. He became a fellow at All Souls College in 1843. 

After graduating from Oxford, he became a member of Lincoln's Inn and was called to the bar in 1848. He was commissioned as a lieutenant in the Sherwood Foresters in April 1850. Byron was appointed as a deputy lieutenant for Essex in September 1853. He was promoted to captain in the Sherwood Foresters in March 1859. Byron married Mary Jane Wescomb in 1851, with the couple having three children. He died suddenly at Westminster in April 1861, predeceasing his father. Byron's son George later became the 9th Baron Byron upon the death of Bryon's elder brother, George Byron, 8th Baron Byron.

References

External links

1822 births
1861 deaths
sportspeople from Cheltenham
People educated at Westminster School, London
Alumni of Balliol College, Oxford
English cricketers
Oxford University cricketers
Fellows of All Souls College, Oxford
Members of Lincoln's Inn
English barristers
Sherwood Foresters officers
Deputy Lieutenants of Essex
Younger sons of barons
Frederick
Military personnel from Gloucestershire